Leevi Asser Kuuranne (previously Lindström; 2 February 1915 in Tampere – 19 July 1965) was a Finnish actor. He is best remembered for his role as a butler Veijonen in a Matti Kassila film Komisario Palmun erehdys (1960).  Kuuranne worked in several Finnish theatres and appeared in nine films during his career. He was married to Raili Kuuranne (previously Pohjanheimo, originally Valkola) (1919–2010).

Filmography 

Oi, muistatkos... (1954)
Ratkaisun päivät (1956)
Sven Tuuva (1958)
Komisario Palmun erehdys (1960)
Pikku Pietarin piha (1961)
Miljoonavaillinki (1961)
Varjostettua valoa (1962)
Tie pimeään (1962)
Villin Pohjolan salattu laakso (1963)

References

External links 
 

1915 births
1965 deaths
Male actors from Tampere
People from Häme Province (Grand Duchy of Finland)
20th-century Finnish male actors
Finnish male film actors